Phua is a Malaysian and Singaporean spelling of the Chinese family name Pan (Mandarin), also spelled Poon, Pun or Phoon (Cantonese), and Pua, Puah or Phuah (Hokkien, Teochew or Hainanese) and may refer to:

Pua Hak Chuan (born 1978), Singaporean criminal and murder suspect
 Denise Phua (born 1959), Singaporean politician
 Phua Siok Gek Cynthia (born 1958), Singaporean politician
 Willie Phua (born 1928), Singaporean photojournalist
 Phua Chu Kang, character in the Singaporean sitcom of the same name